Anders Perklev (born 8 January 1960) was the Prosecutor-General of Sweden.

References

Living people
21st-century Swedish lawyers
1960 births
Place of birth missing (living people)
Prosecutors general